Admiral Turner may refer to:

 Arthur Francis Turner (1912–1991), British naval officer
 Frederick C. Turner (1923–2014), U.S. Navy vice admiral
 Richmond K. Turner (1885–1961), served in the U.S. Navy during World War II
 Stansfield Turner (1923–2018), Admiral and former Director of Central Intelligence